Lieutenant Colonel Ernest Achey Loftus  (January 1884 − July 1987) was a soldier, teacher and diarist.

Early life
Loftus was a Yorkshireman, born at Hull, January 1884. He is noted as the world’s most durable diarist, having kept a detailed journal, with brief periods of omission, over 91 years, from 1896 to 1987.  Educated at York and Trinity College Dublin, he came to Essex to teach in 1906, as fourth form master at Palmer’s Boys’ School, Grays.  Entering upon a Territorial military career in 1910, Loftus was commissioned 1912.  He subsequently served as Capt., at Gallipoli, Egypt and in France with the Essex Regiment.

Teaching career
Following the Great War 1914-1919, Col. Loftus returned to his educational profession and held the headmastership of Barking Abbey School from 1922, publishing during the succeeding decade various books, including ‘Education and the Citizen’ (1935) and a family record of his wife’s antecedents – ‘The Descendants of Maxmilian Cole’ (1938).  She was Elsie, daughter of a notable landowner and agriculturalist Allen Charles Cole of ‘Condovers’ farm at Low Street, West Tilbury, whom he had married in the village church, 1916.  A short interval of renewed war service came with 1940, after which he resumed his headship at Barking, publishing (with H. F. Chettle) ‘A History of Barking Abbey’, 1954, where he also mentions his induction into the Cotswold Boys Club.

Loftus was gazetted Lt. Col., 1925.  For these and later services, he received the Territorial Decoration.  In 1929 he was appointed Deputy Lieutenant for the county of Essex, serving thereafter in that capacity for 46 years. In 1935 he was living at ‘Polwicks’, Low Street, West Tilbury.

In Africa
At the age of 70, having retired from teaching in the UK, he took up several posts abroad, as Education Officer in Kenya, Nyasaland and Zambia.  He was invested as a Companion of the Order of the British Empire for his contributions to African education.  He died in Harare, Zimbabwe on  7 July 1987 at the age of 103 and his ashes were flown home that summer for interment in the foundation of the medieval Barking Abbey.

Interest in local history
Though his writings about the village were limited to short articles in local newspapers (‘Bata Record’, ‘Grays and Tilbury Gazette’), Loftus envisaged a substantial work, for which meticulous research notebooks were filled.  These, and his correspondence late in life from Africa, proved invaluable to the more recent investigations of the parish heritage.  His expansive diaries, and various other documents, including a comprehensive listing of monumental inscriptions in St. James’ churchyard, West Tilbury, collected by him while on leave in 1940, are now at Thurrock Museum (donated by his sons, Tony and Peter Loftus, October 1987).

Books by Loftus
Education and the Citizen (New-World Series.) 1935
Growls and Grumbles: chiefly educational with a dash of local history ... Being a selection of ... published articles. With a portrait; 1949
A History of Barking Abbey; 1954
Speke and the Nile source (Early travellers in East Africa); 1964
A visual history of East Africa; 1966

Notes

1884 births
1987 deaths
Alumni of Trinity College Dublin
Gallipoli campaign
Commanders of the Order of the British Empire
Essex Regiment officers
British Army personnel of World War I
Military personnel from Kingston upon Hull
People from West Tilbury
British centenarians
Men centenarians